Rage: A Love Story is a young adult novel by Julie Anne Peters. It was first published in hardback in 2009. The story follows Johanna who falls in love with Reeve who has suffered much abuse in her life. When their relationship struggles, Reeve begins to physically abuse Johanna who stays with her girlfriend despite the violence. The cover is a reference to the famous pop art image by Robert Indiana.

Plot
Johanna is a senior in high school living in the apartment above the home occupied her older sister Tessa. Both her parents have died and she has come out as a lesbian to her best friend Novak and her sister Tessa. A teacher ropes Johanna into tutoring Robbie, a boy with mild autism so he can graduate; Robbie happens to be the twin brother of Johanna's secret crush, Reeve Hartt. As Johanna tries to get closer to Reeve, she begins to experience some of the physical abuse that is part of Reeve's daily life, living with a mother who is a drug addict and a violent uncle. Because Johanna believes she is in love with Reeve, she suffers through the emotional, verbal and physical abuse of the girl she wants as her girlfriend.

See also

Lesbian teen fiction

References

External links

Author's official website

2009 American novels
American LGBT novels
American young adult novels
Books about autism
Novels with lesbian themes
2000s LGBT novels
Lesbian teen fiction
LGBT-related young adult novels
Domestic violence in fiction
2009 LGBT-related literary works